The 2021 Toyota U.S Open Swimming Championships was held from December 1 to 4, 2021 at Greensboro Aquatic Center in Greensboro, North Carolina, United States. Competition was conducted in a long course (50-meter) pool.

Results

Men

Women

Championships records set

References

External links
 Results
 Results book

Swimming competitions in the United States
2021 in swimming
December 2021 sports events in the United States
2021 in sports in North Carolina